Heinz Günthardt and Balázs Taróczy were the defending champions, but lost in the first round to Rod Frawley and Chris Lewis.

Peter McNamara and Paul McNamee won the title by defeating Mark Edmondson and Sherwood Stewart 6–7, 7–6, 6–3 in the final.

Seeds

Draw

Draw

References

External links
 Official results archive (ATP)
 Official results archive (ITF)

Monte Carlo Doubles